Sidney Williamson ( – 7 October 1935) was a notable New Zealand singer, conductor and singing teacher. He was born in London, England. in about 1870.

References

1870 births
1935 deaths
20th-century New Zealand male singers
English emigrants to New Zealand